Louis Bourgeois (31 July 1937 – 22 February 2022) was a French footballer who played as a forward for Lille, USL Dunkerque, Reims, and US Billy-Berclau. He died on 22 February 2022, at the age of 84.

Honours
 Division 2: 1965–66

References

1937 births
2022 deaths
Sportspeople from Pas-de-Calais
French footballers
Association football forwards
Ligue 1 players
Ligue 2 players
Lille OSC players
USL Dunkerque players
Stade de Reims players
Footballers from Hauts-de-France